Cryptachaea blattea is a species of cobweb spider in the family Theridiidae. It is found in Africa, and has been introduced into the United States, Chile, the Azores, Europe, Australia, New Zealand, and Hawaii.

References

Theridiidae
Articles created by Qbugbot
Spiders described in 1886